Pronotacantha is a genus of stilt bugs in the family Berytidae. There are about seven described species in Pronotacantha.

Species
These seven species belong to the genus Pronotacantha:
 Pronotacantha annulata Uhler, 1893
 Pronotacantha armata Stusak, 1973
 Pronotacantha concolor Henry, 1997
 Pronotacantha depressa Henry, 1997
 Pronotacantha mexicana Henry, 1997
 Pronotacantha quadrispina Henry, 1997
 Pronotacantha stusaki Henry, 1997

References

Further reading

 
 
 

Berytidae
Articles created by Qbugbot